Stefan Bomhard (born 1967/1968) is a German businessman, and the chief executive officer (CEO) of Imperial Brands since October 2020.

Bomhard earned a bachelor's degree from Middlesex University, a master's degree from Reutlingen University, and a doctorate in marketing from the University of Bradford.

In February 2020, it was announced that Bomhard, who was CEO of Inchcape plc, would become the next CEO of Imperial Brands, and succeeded Alison Cooper in October 2020.

Bomhard was appointed CEO of Inchcape plc in 2015, having been president of Bacardi's European region. He was chief commercial officer of Cadbury, having been chief operating officer of Unilever Food Solutions Europe, and before that  management and sales and marketing roles at Diageo (Burger King) and Procter & Gamble.

References

Living people
Unilever people
Diageo people
Procter & Gamble people
British chief executives
Alumni of Middlesex University
Reutlingen University alumni
Alumni of the University of Bradford
1960s births